A social experiment is a type of psychological or sociological research for testing people's reactions to certain situations or events. The experiment depends on a particular social approach where the main source of information is the participants' point of view and knowledge. To carry out a social experiment, specialists usually split participants into two groups — active participants (people who take action in particular events) and respondents (people who react to the action). Throughout the experiment, specialists monitor participants to identify the effects and differences resulting from the experiment. Intentional communities are generally considered social experiments.

Social psychology offers insight into how individuals act in groups and how behavior is affected by social burdens and pressures. In most social experiments, the subjects are unaware that they are partaking in an experiment. Several "actors" or "plants" are used to study social behaviors. Companies have also used social experiments to collect consumer data and their opinions about a product or a particular topic.

History
In 1895, American psychologist Norman Triplett constructed one of the earliest known social experiments, in which he found out that cyclists managed to ride a bike faster when racing against another person rather than racing against the clock. He duplicated the experiment in a laboratory using children and fishing reels and received similar results. Field social experiments had proved to be efficient as it reflects real life due to its natural setting.

The social experiments commonly referred to today were conducted decades later, in which an experiment is done in a controlled environment such as a laboratory. An example of this is Stanley Milgram's obedience experiment in 1963. Social experiments began in the United States as a test of the negative income tax concept in the late 1960s and since then have been conducted on all the populated continents.

During the 1970s, criticism of the ethics and accusations of gender and racial bias led to a reassessment of both the field of social psychology and the conducted experiments. While experimental methods were still employed, other methods gained popularity.

Ethics 
Social experimentation has raised many ethical concerns, due to its manipulation of large population groups, often without the consent or knowledge of the subjects. In some instances, social experimentation has been staged unknowingly to the viewer to promote the image of the individual or for the pure purpose of generating controversy.

Researchers also believed that the impact of Informal Social Experiments via social media videos may have negative consequences on formal social marketing research as well as the society in general, detailing that while Informal Social Experiments addresses moral and social issues such as child safety, self-confidence, etc., producers of these social experiments might do it for their gain and benefits.

Well-known social experiments

Bystander Apathy (Effect) 

Based on the murder of Kitty Genovese outside her home, The New York Times stated that there were 38 witnesses that either saw or heard the fatal stabbing take place, and not a single person came to her aid. Although this number was proven to be exaggerated, this murder was coined "bystander apathy" by social psychologists Bibb Latané and John Darley in 1968.

For their experiment, Latané and Darley tried to replicate the Genovese slaying by having participants aware of each other but unable to communicate directly. Each participant was in a cubicle in contact with each other via a microphone; however, only one voice was allowed to speak at a time. A taped recording played of a participant having an epileptic seizure. When the participant believed themselves to be alone they invariably attempted to find help. When the participant believed others were around the speed and frequency of response declined significantly. The authors concluded that situational factors play an influential role in bystander apathy. People are less likely to help in an emergency if other people are present. Two reasons were offered by Latané and Darley: first is diffusion of responsibility, and second is pluralistic ignorance or the mentality that if nobody else is helping, then I am not needed as well.

Research on bystander apathy by psychologist Kyle Thomas et al. found that people's decisions to help are influenced by their level of knowledge. While the diffusion of responsibility and pluralistic ignorance are factors, the researchers found that bystanders also consider what they know about other bystanders and the situation before getting involved.

HighScope

The HighScope Perry Preschool Project was evaluated in a randomized controlled trial of 123 children (58 were randomly assigned to a treatment group that received the program and a control group of 65 children that did not receive the program). Prior to the program, the preschool and control groups were equivalent in measures of intellectual performance and demographic characteristics. After the program, the educational and life outcomes for the children receiving the program were much superior to outcomes for the children not receiving the program. Many of the program effects were significant or approaching significance. At age 40, the participants were interviewed once more, and school, social services, and arrest records were pulled. The participants had higher-earning jobs, committed fewer crimes, and were more likely to hold a job than adults who did not attend preschool.

RAND Health Insurance Experiment

The RAND Health Insurance Experiment was an experimental study of health care costs, utilization, and outcomes in the United States which assigned people randomly to different kinds of plans and followed their behavior from 1974 to 1982. As a result, it provided stronger evidence than studies that examine people afterward who were not randomly assigned. It concluded that cost-sharing reduced "inappropriate or unnecessary" medical care (overutilization), but also reduced "appropriate or needed" medical care. It did not have enough statistical power to tell whether people who got less appropriate or needed care were more likely to die as a result.

Oportunidades/Prospera/Progresa

Oportunidades is a government social assistance (welfare) program in Mexico founded in 2002, based on a previous program called Progresa created in 1997. It is designed to target poverty by providing cash payments to families in exchange for regular school attendance, health clinic visits, and nutrition support. Oportunidades is credited with decreasing poverty and improving health and educational attainment in regions where it has been deployed.

Moving to Opportunity

Moving to Opportunity for Fair Housing was a randomized social experiment sponsored by the United States Department of Housing and Urban Development in the 1990s among 4600 low-income families with children living in high-poverty public housing projects. The program was designed based on the assumption that households benefit from living in higher-opportunity neighborhoods. Early evaluations of the MTO program, however, showed minimal gains for participant families. One explanation for these findings is the short length of time that MTO families typically spent in lower-poverty neighborhoods; the positive effects of longer-term exposure to low-poverty neighborhoods appear more promising.

Stanford prison experiment

The Stanford prison experiment was a study of the psychological effects of becoming a prisoner or prison guard. The experiment was conducted at Stanford University on August 14–20, 1971, by a team of researchers led by psychology professor Philip Zimbardo using college students. It was funded by the U.S. Office of Naval Research and was of interest to both the U.S. Navy and Marine Corps as an investigation into the causes of conflict between military guards and prisoners. The experiment is a study on the psychology of imprisonment and is a topic covered in most introductory psychology textbooks.

Experiments by Muzafer Sherif

Sherif was a founder of modern social psychology who developed several techniques for understanding social processes, particularly social norms, and social conflict. Sherif's experimental study of the autokinetic movement demonstrated how mental evaluation norms were created by human beings. Sherif is equally famous for the Robbers Cave Experiments. This series of experiments, begun in Connecticut and concluded in Oklahoma, took boys from intact middle-class families, who were carefully screened to be psychologically normal, delivered them to a summer camp setting (with researchers doubling as counsellors), and created social groups that came into conflict with each other.

Bobo doll experiment 

The Bobo doll experiment was a study carried out by Albert Bandura who was a professor at Stanford University. It focused on the study of aggression using three groups of preschoolers as the subjects. Bandura took inflatable plastic toys called Bobo dolls and weighted them down to always stand upright. The preschoolers were divided into three groups by gender, and then into six subgroups. One of the groups would observe an adult act aggressively towards the Bobo doll, another group would observe an adult with non-aggressive behaviours, and the last group would not be exposed to any behaviour models. The study found the preschoolers exposed to the aggressive behaviour had imitated the aggressiveness towards the doll, regardless of gender. The other two groups showed significantly less hostility towards the doll. The study had shown aggressive and non-aggressive behaviours were learned by observing others and had a significant effect on the subjects even after the study was concluded.

Stanford marshmallow experiment 

The Stanford marshmallow experiment was a study done by a psychologist Walter Mischel on delayed gratification in the early 1970s. During the three studies, a child was offered a choice between one small reward provided immediately or two small rewards if they waited for a short period, approximately 15 minutes, during which the tester left the room and then returned. (The reward was sometimes a marshmallow, but often a cookie or a pretzel.) In follow-up studies, the researchers found that children who were able to wait longer for the preferred rewards tended to have better life outcomes, as measured by SAT scores, educational attainment, body mass index (BMI), and other life measures.

Asch Conformity experiment 

The Asch experiment took place in the Swarthmore College in 1951. Solomon Asch conducted an experiment to investigate the extent where social pressure from a majority group could affect a person to conform. Asch took 50 people from the college to participate in a vision test. They were paired up with 7 other people who they believed to be random, but instead were part of a control group who would choose the same answers. The real participant would give his or her answers last. Out of the 18 trials, the group gave the wrong answers 12 times. 75% of the participants conformed once or more, and the remaining 25% never conformed to the group's wrong answers. Participants were interviewed after the experiment, and although they knew the answers were wrong, they conformed to not be ridiculed by the group. A few individuals said they thought the group's answers were correct. Asch concluded that people conformed because they either wanted to fit in or thought the group was right.

Hawthorne experiment 

The Hawthorne experiment took place in 1924 in the city of Chicago. Elton Mayo is widely known as the person behind the project. However, his involvement started in 1928 after he was invited by George Pennock, the assistant works manager for the Hawthorne plant of Western Electric. During the experiment, workers were separated into two groups to study the effects of different incentives on their productivity. Different variations were tested, such as changing the light levels in the rooms. Other, more obvious incentives, such as monetary incentives and rest pauses, were also tested and seemed to show positive results. Several conclusions were made, after the experiments finished: 
 When employees had more freedom to choose their own conditions and output standards, their productivity increased;
 Social interaction played an important role in the creation of a high level of group cohesion;
 People tend to put more effort when they feel their worth and cooperate with each other.

Halo Effect 

The Halo Effect was first developed and empirically examined by an American psychologist named Edward Thorndike in his 1920 piece "A Constant Error in Psychological Ratings". The halo effect, also called the halo error, refers to a type of cognitive bias in which we perceive people as better due to their other related traits. 

A typical halo effect example is the attractiveness stereotype, which refers to ascribing positive qualities to physically attractive people. Often, attractive individuals are believed to have lower mortality rates, better mental health, and higher intelligence. However, this is a cognitive error based on one's inclinations, beliefs, and social perception.   The halo effect is a well-known social psychology discovery. It is the concept that a person's overall evaluations (e.g., she is pleasant) bleed over into judgments regarding their characteristics (e.g. she is intelligent). It's also known as the "beauty is good" notion or the "physical attractiveness" stereotype.

Informal social experiments 

The Button (Reddit)
Place (Reddit)

References 

Experimental social sciences
Social statistics
Methods in sociology